Boy River is a city in Cass County, Minnesota, United States. The population was 47 at the 2010 census. It is part of the Brainerd Micropolitan Statistical Area.

History
A post office called Boy River was established in 1910, and remained in operation until it was discontinued in 1985. The city took its name from the nearby Boy River. In 2018, the State of Minnesota denied the City of Boy River's petition to dissolve after a special election in which three of five total voters voted to not dissolve.

Geography
County Roads 4 and 63 are the main routes in the community.

Demographics

2010 census
As of the census of 2010, there were 47 people, 21 households, and 10 families living in the city. The racial makeup of the city was 100.0% White.

There were 21 households, of which 38.1% had children under the age of 18 living with them, 23.8% were married couples living together, 19.0% had a female householder with no husband present, 4.8% had a male householder with no wife present, and 52.4% were non-families. 52.4% of all households were made up of individuals, and 14.3% had someone living alone who was 65 years of age or older. The average household size was 2.24 and the average family size was 3.10.

The median age in the city was 33.5 years. 31.9% of residents were under the age of 18; 6.4% were between the ages of 18 and 24; 27.7% were from 25 to 44; 27.6% were from 45 to 64; and 6.4% were 65 years of age or older. The gender makeup of the city was 44.7% male and 55.3% female.

2000 census
As of the census of 2000, there were 38 people, 18 households, and 9 families living in the city. The racial makeup of the city was 84.21% White, 13.16% Native American, and 2.63% from two or more races. Hispanic or Latino of any race were 2.63% of the population.

There were 18 households, out of which 22.2% had children under the age of 18 living with them, 27.8% were married couples living together, 16.7% had a female householder with no husband present, and 50.0% were non-families. 50.0% of all households were made up of individuals, and 27.8% had someone living alone who was 65 years of age or older. The average household size was 2.11 and the average family size was 3.11.

In the city, the population was spread out, with 28.9% under the age of 18, 7.9% from 18 to 24, 21.1% from 25 to 44, 18.4% from 45 to 64, and 23.7% who were 65 years of age or older. The median age was 41 years. For every 100 females, there were 90.0 males. For every 100 females age 18 and over, there were 68.8 males.

The median income for a household in the city was $13,125, and the median income for a family was $43,125. Males had a median income of $24,375 versus $21,250 for females. The per capita income for the city was $10,556. There were no families and 24.0% of the population living below the poverty line, including no under eighteens and 42.9% of those over 64.

References

Cities in Cass County, Minnesota
Cities in Minnesota
Brainerd, Minnesota micropolitan area